In mathematics, the Gromov boundary of a δ-hyperbolic space (especially a hyperbolic group) is an abstract concept generalizing the boundary sphere of hyperbolic space. Conceptually, the Gromov boundary is the set of all points at infinity. For instance, the Gromov boundary of the real line is two points, corresponding to positive and negative infinity.

Definition

There are several equivalent definitions of the Gromov boundary of a geodesic and proper δ-hyperbolic space. One of the most common uses equivalence classes of geodesic rays.

Pick some point  of a hyperbolic metric space  to be the origin.

Two geodesics  are defined to be equivalent if there is a constant  such that  for all .

Topology

It is useful to use the Gromov product of three points. The Gromov product of three points  in a metric space is
.

These open sets form a basis for the topology of the Gromov boundary.

These open sets are just the set of geodesic rays which follow one fixed geodesic ray up to a distance  before diverging.

This topology makes the Gromov boundary into a compact metrizable space.

The number of ends of a hyperbolic group is the number of components of the Gromov boundary.

Properties of the Gromov boundary
The Gromov boundary has several important properties.

One of the most important properties is that it is a quasi-isometry invariant; that is, if two hyperbolic metric spaces are quasi-isometric, then the quasi-isometry between them gives a homeomorphism between their boundaries. This is important because homeomorphisms of compact spaces are much easier to understand than quasi-isometries of spaces.

Examples
The Gromov boundary of a tree is a Cantor space.
The Gromov boundary of hyperbolic n-space is an (n-1)-dimensional sphere.
The Gromov boundary of the fundamental group of a compact Riemann surface is the unit circle.
The Gromov boundary of most hyperbolic groups is a Menger sponge.

Generalizations

Visual boundary of CAT(0) space

For a complete CAT(0) space X, the visual boundary of X, like the Gromov boundary of  δ-hyperbolic space, consists of equivalence class of asymptotic geodesic rays. However, the Gromov product cannot be used to define a topology on it. For example, in the case of a flat plane, any two geodesic rays issuing from a point not heading in opposite directions will have infinite Gromov product with respect to that point. The visual boundary is instead endowed with the cone topology. Fix a point o in X. Any boundary point can be represented by a unique geodesic ray issuing from o. Given a ray  issuing from o, and positive numbers t > 0 and r > 0, a neighborhood basis at the boundary point  is given by sets of the form
 
The cone topology as defined above is independent of the choice of o.

If X is proper, then the visual boundary with the cone topology is compact. When X is both CAT(0) and proper geodesic δ-hyperbolic space, the cone topology coincides with the topology of Gromov boundary.

Cannon's Conjecture

Cannon's conjecture concerns the classification of groups with a 2-sphere at infinity:

Cannon's conjecture: Every Gromov hyperbolic group with a 2-sphere at infinity acts geometrically on hyperbolic 3-space.

The analog to this conjecture is known to be true for 1-spheres and false for spheres of all dimension greater than 2.

Notes

References
 

Geometric group theory
Properties of groups